Captain John Primrose Hay (4 April 1878 – 5 December 1949) was Labour MP for Glasgow Cathcart.

Hay was born in Coatbridge and was educated at the Glasgow Free Church Training College, and the University of Glasgow.  He became a lecturer in mathematics at Manchuria Christian College from 1906 to 1915, when he joined the Royal Garrison Artillery.  He served in France for the remainder of World War I, becoming a captain.

Hay was a supporter of the Labour Party, for which he stood in Glasgow Cathcart at the 1922 United Kingdom general election, winning the seat.  However, he lost in 1923, and was defeated again in 1924 and 1929.

References

External links 
 

1878 births
1949 deaths
Alumni of the University of Glasgow
People from Coatbridge
Royal Garrison Artillery officers
Scottish Labour MPs
Members of the Parliament of the United Kingdom for Glasgow constituencies
UK MPs 1922–1923
Politicians from North Lanarkshire